Everett James Stull (born August 24, 1971) is a former American professional baseball pitcher.

Career
He was seconded by the Expos to play for the Hunter Eagles in the Australian Baseball League in 1995. In , he joined the Reno Silver Sox of the independent Golden Baseball League and Laredo Broncos of the United Baseball League. In , Stull played for The Grays of the Can-Am League.

References

External links
, or Retrosheet, or Pura Pelota (Venezuelan Winter League)

1971 births
Living people
African-American baseball players
American expatriate baseball players in Canada
Arizona League Brewers players
Atlanta Braves players
Baseball players from Kansas
Harrisburg Senators players
High Desert Mavericks players
Houston Astros scouts
Huntsville Stars players
Indianapolis Indians players
Laredo Broncos players
Major League Baseball pitchers
Milwaukee Brewers players
Montreal Expos players
Ottawa Lynx players
People from Fort Riley, Kansas
Reno Silver Sox (Golden Baseball League) players
Richmond Braves players
Rochester Red Wings players
Tennessee State Tigers baseball players
Tennessee State University alumni
The Grays players
Tiburones de La Guaira players
American expatriate baseball players in Venezuela
Washington Nationals scouts
West Palm Beach Expos players
American expatriate baseball players in Australia
Burlington Bees players
Jamestown Expos players
21st-century African-American sportspeople
20th-century African-American sportspeople